The 2013–14 Baltic Basketball League was the 10th anniversary season of the Baltic Basketball League.

This time the format featured 21 teams – 6 from Lithuania, 6 from Estonia, 5 from Latvia, 2 from Kazakhstan and 1 from Sweden and Finland. For the regular season the teams were divided into three groups of seven teams and competed in a round-robin competition system, with each team facing their opponent twice. Top five teams of each group and the best sixth placed team qualified for the eight-finals. All play-off games were played in home-and-away series.

The Finals were a Lithuanian clash as Šiauliai took the 2014 title by beating TonyBet 140–123 on aggregate score. Estonian team Tartu Ülikool/Rock won their second Baltic League bronze by beating Tampereen Pyrintö of Finland with aggregate score of 149–127.

Teams

Regular season

If teams are level on record at the end of the Regular season, tiebreakers are applied in the following order:
 Points.
 Points counting the games between tied teams only.
 Point difference between tied teams.
 League-wide point difference.

The criteria for determination of the best team placed 6th:
– Total number of points in each group.
– Total point average in each group

Group A

Group B

Group C

Play-offs

In the knockout phase rounds will be played in a home-and-away format, with the overall cumulative score determining the winner of a round. Thus, the score of one single game can be tied.

All qualified teams for the BBL Eighth-finals will be classified from 1st place to 16th place according to their win–loss records:
 Place in the group.
 Points.
 Points average.

Bracket

Bronze medal playoff

Finals

Game 1

Game 2

Individual statistics
Players qualify to this category by having at least 50% games played. Statistics include only Regular Season games.
Source: Baltic Basketball League player statistics

Efficiency

Points

Rebounds

Assists

Awards

BBL 2013–14 Season MVP
  Travis Leslie (Šiauliai)

BBL 2014 Finals MVP
  Travis Leslie (Šiauliai)

Top scorer
  Jānis Kaufmanis (Valmiera)

MVP of the Month
{| class="wikitable" style="text-align: center;"
! align="center"|Month
! align="center" width=170|Player
! align="center" width=170|Team
! align="center" width=|Ref.
|-
|October 2013||align="left"| Gintaras Leonavičius ||align="left"| Nevėžis || 
|-
|November 2013||align="left"| Jānis Timma ||align="left"| Ventspils || 
|-
|December 2013||align="left"| Joakim Kjellbom ||align="left"| Norrköping Dolphins || 
|-
|January 2014||align="left"| Troy Barnies ||align="left"| Jēkabpils || 
|-
|February 2014||align="left"| Tauras Jogėla ||align="left"| Nevėžis ||

References

External links
 

Baltic Basketball League seasons
2013–14 in European basketball leagues
2013–14 in Lithuanian basketball
2013–14 in Estonian basketball
2013–14 in Latvian basketball
2013–14 in Kazakhstani basketball
2013–14 in Swedish basketball
2013–14 in Finnish basketball